Eucithara compressicosta is a small sea snail, a marine gastropod mollusk in the family Mangeliidae.

Distribution
This marine species is found off the Philippines and the Mariana Islands.

Description
The length of the shell attains 8.2 mm, its diameter 3.4 mm.

References

 Boettger, O. 1895. Die marinen Mollusken der Philippinen. IV. Die Pleurotomiden. Nachr. deutsch. Malacolozool. Gesell. 27(1-2): 1-20,41- 63

External links
  Tucker, J.K. 2004 Catalog of recent and fossil turrids (Mollusca: Gastropoda). Zootaxa 682:1-1295
 Kilburn R.N. 1992. Turridae (Mollusca: Gastropoda) of southern Africa and Mozambique. Part 6. Subfamily Mangeliinae, section 1. Annals of the Natal Museum, 33: 461–575

compressicosta
Gastropods described in 1895